Pseudopsellonus is a monotypic genus of Papuan running crab spiders containing the single species, Pseudopsellonus papuanus. It was first described by J. I. Balogh in 1936, and is only found in Papua New Guinea.

See also
 List of Philodromidae species

References

Monotypic Araneomorphae genera
Philodromidae
Spiders of Asia